Dave (David) Mackey, born November 22, 1969, is a professional American ultra runner and adventure racer who lives in Boulder, Colorado. Mackey has set course records at many significant national ultra-distance trail running races, and spent several years adventure racing nationally and internationally.

In 2011, Mackey won the Montrail Cup, which he also won in 2004. He won the Ultrarunning Magazine North American Ultrarunner of the Year in 2011, and was runner-up in 2004. He won the USA Track and Field Ultrarunner of the Year in 2004 and in 2005, and also has won several USATF national trail running titles at three different distances: 50K, 50 mile, and 100 kilometers. In running from one side of the Grand Canyon and back, also known as the rim-to-rim-to-rim (R2R2R), Mackey set a former record of 6:59:57. The current record is held by Jim Walmsley.

Mackey also holds speed climbing records in the Boulder, Colorado, area, including the fastest round-trip time climbing and descending the Third Flatiron from Chautauqua Park in Boulder.

He is a physician assistant in emergency medicine.

Accident and injury

On May 23, 2015, Mackey fell off of a ridge, while training at Bear Peak near his home in Boulder. Among other injuries, he sustained a serious damage on his left lower leg. He recovered to the point he could walk (with a limp), but after a year and a half of surgeries, recurring infections and constant pain, he decided to get his ill leg amputated below the knee, hoping a prosthetic device would provide him better possibility to resume life as it was before the accident.

Significant course records and wins
Waldo 100k, course record
Miwok 100K, three-time winner and course record holder
American River 50 Mile, winner
Bandera 100K, course record
Fire Trails 50 Mile, course record
Moab Red Hot 50k, course record
Rock and Ice Ultra, inaugural winner
Headlands 50K, course record
Way Too Cool 50K, three-time winner
Zane Grey Highline Trail 50 Mile Run, course record
Mountain Masochist Trail Run (50 miles), 3 time-winner

References

1969 births
Living people
American male long-distance runners
American male ultramarathon runners
People from Novato, California